Luther Kirk (born November 7, 1996) is an American football free safety who is a free agent.

Early life
Kirk was born on November 7, 1996, in Garland, Texas. He attended Garland High School, and played quarterback and safety for their football team. As a senior, he completed 87-of-165 passing attempts, throwing for 1,160 yards and 12 touchdowns. He also recorded 93 rushes for 798 yards and five touchdowns that year.

College career
After graduating from high school, Kirk committed to Illinois State University. As a freshman in 2015, he appeared in 10 games at safety making a total of 18 tackles. He played in all 12 games as a sophomore, finishing the year with 15 tackles. He left the team in 2017, but returned for Spring 2018 workouts. He was named team captain that year, and started all 11 games at the safety position. With five interceptions, he ranked first in the Missouri Valley Football Conference (MVFC). He also placed second on the team with 61 tackles, and was named first-team all-conference at the end of the year. As a senior in 2019, he started all 15 games, leading the team with 89 tackles. He was named an AFCA FCS Coaches' and HERO Sports FCS All-America first-team selection and earned STATS FCS All-America second-team honors.

Professional career

Dallas Cowboys
After going unselected in the 2020 NFL Draft, Kirk signed with the Dallas Cowboys as an undrafted free agent. He was waived at the final roster cuts on September 5, but re-signed to the practice squad a day later. He was released from the practice squad on September 15.

Minnesota Vikings
On September 28, Kirk was signed by the Minnesota Vikings to their practice squad. He was promoted to the active roster prior to their game against the Green Bay Packers, and reverted afterwards. Kirk was waived/injured after the final roster cuts in August .

Atlanta Falcons
On October 25, 2021, Kirk was signed by the Atlanta Falcons to the practice squad. He was elevated to the active roster for their game against the Buffalo Bills, and made his NFL debut in the 15–29 loss.

On May 16, 2022, Kirk was waived by the Falcons.

Cleveland Browns
On May 17, 2022, Kirk was claimed off waivers by the Cleveland Browns. He was waived on August 22, 2022.

References

1996 births
Living people
Players of American football from Texas
American football defensive backs
Illinois State Redbirds football players
Dallas Cowboys players
Minnesota Vikings players
Atlanta Falcons players
Cleveland Browns players